Edge is an album by Daryl Braithwaite. It was recorded between April–September 1988 and released in November 1988. It reached No.1 on the Australian ARIA Charts for 3 weeks in 1989.

Braithwaite toured the album across Australia and New Zealand in 1989 and the album was certified 3× platinum in October 1989.

Simon Hussey was nominated for Producer of the Year for Edge at the ARIA Music Awards of 1989, but lost to Age of Reason.

Track listing
"As the Days Go By" (Ian Thomas) – 4:04
"You Could Be Wrong" (Simon Hussey) – 3:22 
"All I Do" (Thomas) – 4:06
"Let Me Be" (Hussey, David Reyne) – 5:36 
"Sugar Train" (Jef Scott) – 3:42
"Down Down" (Scott) – 4:37
"In My Life" (Chris Doheny) – 5:08
"Edge (Instrumental)" (Jef Scott, Simon Hussey) – 0:34
"I Don't Remember" (Peter Gabriel) – 4:09
"One Summer" (Daryl Braithwaite) – 3:43
"It's All in the Music" (Braithwaite, Garth Porter) – 3:40
"All The Same" (Hussey, Lisa Bade, Mark Greig) – 3:57
"Up-Out" (Andy Cichon, Braithwaite, Scott, John Watson, Scott Griffiths, Hussey) – 3:58
"Pretending to Care" (Todd Rundgren) – 3:39

Personnel
 Daryl Braithwaite – vocals
 Andy Cichon – bass
 Jef Scott – guitars, keyboards, additional backing vocals, additional drumming
 John Watson – drums
 Simon Hussey – keyboards, drum machine, producer
 Scott Griffiths – keyboards
 John Farnham – additional backing vocals
 Glenn Braithwaite – additional backing vocals
 David Hussey – additional drumming
 Brett Kingman – guitar (on track "Up-Out")

Release history

Chart positions

Weekly charts

Year-end charts

Singles

Certifications

See also
List of number-one albums in Australia during the 1980s

References

1988 albums
Daryl Braithwaite albums